Machettira Raju Poovamma (born 5 June 1990) is an Indian sprinter who specialises in the 400 metres distance. As a member of the Indian 4 × 400 m relay teams she participated in the 2016 Olympics and won gold medals at the 2014 and 2018 Asian Games and 2013 and 2017 Asian championships; individually she won a silver medal in 2013 and a bronze in 2014 at those competitions. She received the Arjuna Award in 2015 for her contributions to athletics.

Early life
Poovamma was born to M. G. Raju and Jaji. She completed her primary and higher education in Mangalore and acquired her bachelor's degree in business management from the Sri Dharmasthala Manjunatheshwara College of Business Management, Karnataka. Her brother MR Manju also competed in the 400 m events at the national level.

Career highlights
Poovamma won a silver medal in the 400 m and a gold in the 4 × 400 m relay at the 2008 Commonwealth Youth Games. She then won a senior national 400 m title in September 2011 in Kolkata. At the 2012 Asian Grands Prix Poovamma won two gold and a silver medal.  She also won a gold medal at the 2013 Asian Grand Prix in Bangkok. Poovamma represented India in the Moscow World Athletics Championships 2013   where she was also a part of the women's 4 × 400 m relay team.

She won the gold medal in women's 4×400 metres relay at the 2014 Asian Games in Incheon, South Korea along with Tintu Luka, Mandeep Kaur and Priyanka Pawar. The team clocked 3:28:68 to break the Games Record. This is India's 4th consecutive gold in the event since 2002.

In 2017 she was part of the winning 4 × 400 m team at the 2017 Asian Athletics Championships in Bhubaneshwar, which also included Debashree Mazumdar,  Jisna Mathew and Nirmala Sheoran. The team had a problematic baton exchange, but Nirmala recovered the time in the final leg.

Competition record

References

1990 births
Living people
Sportswomen from Karnataka
People from Kodagu district
Indian female sprinters
Athletes (track and field) at the 2014 Asian Games
Athletes (track and field) at the 2018 Asian Games
Athletes (track and field) at the 2018 Commonwealth Games
World Athletics Championships athletes for India
Indian female middle-distance runners
21st-century Indian women
21st-century Indian people
Asian Games gold medalists for India
Asian Games bronze medalists for India
Olympic athletes of India
Athletes (track and field) at the 2016 Summer Olympics
Medalists at the 2014 Asian Games
Medalists at the 2018 Asian Games
Asian Games medalists in athletics (track and field)
Recipients of the Rajyotsava Award 2014
South Asian Games gold medalists for India
South Asian Games medalists in athletics
Recipients of the Arjuna Award
Commonwealth Games competitors for India
Olympic female sprinters